Lindbergh Educational Center, also known as Manteca Adult School, located in Manteca, California, is part of the Manteca Unified School District. Thousands of its students have earned their high school diplomas or General Educational Development certificates. Its vocational training program "has earned numerous recognition for its effectiveness." In 1997, its Teen Parent Panel won the Action on Behalf of Children (ABC) Award.

Program aspects
Lindbergh offers high school diploma classes, GED preparation, ESL courses, older adult programs, music, art, and fitness classes.  The center also offers courses for students interested in learning or improving vocational skills ranging from cabinetmaking to medical transcription. First Aid and CPR "outside training conferences" are offered at the center through Valley Mountain Regional Center located in Stockton, California. It is a member of Cisco System's Cisco Networking Academy in the California Congressional District 11.

Generally, there is a fee for registering. Senior adults and students taking classes for high school credit are given a discount.

Lindbergh Educational Center is housed in one of Manteca’s historical buildings, a Late Gothic Revival, constructed in 1928.

Additional national program offering
As of 2006, Lindbergh Educational Center actively offered the National Girls Collaborative Project's Girls Discover program which focuses on Science, Technology, Engineering and Math. "The NGCP is designed to reach girl-serving STEM organizations across the United States."

Courses offered
Through its Regional Occupation Center, Lindbergh Education Center offers a number of courses that are handicapped accessible to include:

Career Guidance
Clinical Medical Assistant
Computers
Exercise & Fitness
GED Preparation
English as a Second Language
Guitar
High School Diploma
Medical Terminology/Transcriber
Older Adult Programs
Quilting
Yoga

Internet training
On May 13, 2009, Atsuhisa Okura, a Japanese Manga artist, taught students via an internet "virtual classroom".

Sources
 LINDBERGH EDUCATIONAL CENTER www.mantecausd.net Retrieved:2010-05-03.

References

Education in San Joaquin County, California